The Israel–South Africa Agreement (ISSA) was a secret defence co-operation agreement signed in 1975 between Israel and the government of South Africa.

The agreement covered many different areas of defence co-operation at a time when both countries were unable to source weapons and defence technology freely on the international market, primarily because of arms embargoes in place at the time, in South Africa's case due to apartheid.

See also

Israel–South Africa relations
United Nations Security Council Resolution 418
South Africa and weapons of mass destruction

Footnotes

References

Israel–South Africa relations
1975 in South Africa
1975 in Israel
Treaties concluded in 1975
Military alliances involving South Africa
Treaties of South Africa
Treaties of Israel
1975 in South African law